Kevin Boyer (born 24 April 1993) is a Canadian skeleton racer. He competed in the 2018 Winter Olympics.

References

1993 births
Living people
Skeleton racers at the 2018 Winter Olympics
Canadian male skeleton racers
Olympic skeleton racers of Canada
20th-century Canadian people
21st-century Canadian people